The Florida Film Critics Circle Award for Best Supporting Actor is an award given by the Florida Film Critics Circle to honor the finest supporting male acting achievements in film-making.

Winners

1990s

2000s

2010s

2020s

Florida Film Critics Circle Awards
Film awards for supporting actor